The Alabama Crimson Tide women's basketball program represents the University of Alabama in the sport of women's basketball. The team competes in the Southeastern Conference and National Collegiate Athletic Association. They are coached by eighth-year head coach Kristy Curry.

History
The Crimson Tide has appeared in 10 NCAA women's basketball tournaments, including an eight-year streak of consecutive appearances in the tournament stretching from 1992 to 1999. In 10 NCAA tournament appearances, Alabama has advanced to the "Sweet Sixteen" six times and the "Elite Eight" and the "Final Four" once, in 1994.

Notable seasons include 1980–81 (21–12 record, 2nd-place finish in the SEC, a 77–71 victory over Tennessee, coached by Ann Cronic), 1983–84 (21–9 record, a 2nd-place finish in the SEC, an 85–66 victory over Tennessee, and a final AP National Ranking of No. 12, coached by Ken Weeks), 1985–86 (20–9 record, coached by 1986 SEC Coach of the Year recipient, Lois Myers), 1991–92 (a 23–7 record, SEC 3rd place, final AP National Ranking of No. 18, coached by Rick Moody), 1993–94 (a 26–7 record, 4th place SEC, Midwest Regional Tournament Champion, Final Four Participant, coached by Rick Moody), 1994–95 (a 22–9 record, final AP national ranking of No. 13, coached by Rick Moody), 1995–96 (a 24–8 record, 3rd place SEC, final national AP ranking of No. 10, coached by Rick Moody), 1996–97 (a 25–7 record, midseason No. 2 national ranking, 2nd place SEC (10–2), final AP national ranking of No. 8, coached by Rick Moody), 1997–98 (a 24–10 record, 2nd place SEC, final AP national ranking of No. 11, coached by Rick Moody).

Former NCAA All-American and WNBA player Dominique Canty played for the Crimson Tide 1995-1999. Other former Alabama players include Shalonda Enis, Niesa Johnson, Navonda Moore, and Tausha Mills.

The University of Alabama also has a Women's Wheelchair Basketball Program that began in 2003.  The Crimson Tide have won the national championship in 2009 (34–2 record, with both losses to men's teams), 2010, and 2021. They were also the runners-up in 2008.

Coaches

Year-by-year results

NCAA tournament results

References

External links